Morville Hall is a grade I listed country house and gardens in the care of the National Trust in the county of Shropshire, England, United Kingdom.

Morville Hall is located at the junction of the A458 road and the B4368 road, three miles outside the market town of Bridgnorth.

It is a large grey stone mansion with projecting wings, originally built in  two storeys in the 16th-century but increased to three as part of an 18th-century enlargement. Once part of the Aldenham estate, the house stands on the site of the abandoned Morville Priory. 

Morville Hall was originally an Elizabethan country house dating from 1546, at the time the site was acquired by Roger Smyth, who married into the local Cressett family. It was enlarged and expanded around 1750 by Arthur Weaver, MP for Bridgnorth.

The gardens are the main attraction for many visitors and incorporates the Dower house Gardens and features such as a Cloister garden and Elizabethan knot garden. The gardens have been a 15-year project for Katherine Swift who wanted to show how gardens have developed and evolved through history. Each section of her garden relates to a previous occupant of the Hall, from the Elizabethan Smyths through to the 18th century Weavers, and finally to the seven Victorian age Warren sisters who lived on in the house long after the death of their father, the last one, Juliana, dying in the 1920s. 

The property has belonged to the National Trust since 1965.

See also
Grade I listed buildings in Shropshire
Listed buildings in Morville, Shropshire

References

External links 
National Trust website on Morville Hall
Visit Bridgnorth feature on Morville Hall & Gardens
Archenfield Archaeology on Morville Hall
www.geograph.co.uk : photos of Morville Hall and surrounding area

Historic house museums in Shropshire
National Trust properties in Shropshire
Country houses in Shropshire
Gardens in Shropshire
Buildings and structures in Shropshire
Grade I listed buildings in Shropshire